Angus William "Gus" Black (6 May 1925 – 14 February 2018) was a Scottish international rugby union player, who played for  and the Lions.

Rugby Union career

Amateur career

Black played for Edinburgh University.

He went on to play for Leicester and Bristol during his National Service.

He played for the Royal Air Force Rugby Union in 1954.

Provincial career

Black was capped for Edinburgh District.

He played for the Cities District side in their match against Australia in October 1947.

He turned out for the Scotland Possibles side in 1947.

International career

Black made his first international appearance on New Year's Day 1947 while studying medicine at the University of Edinburgh. He also played for Edinburgh University rugby team, and was on the 1950 British Lions tour to New Zealand and Australia where he played in two tests, playing in a 9–9 draw in Dunedin and a 0–8 loss in Christchurch.

Death

Black lived in Lundin Links in Fife. After moving into a care home in the 1990s, Black died in February 2018 and at the time of his death was the oldest living Lions player.

References

1925 births
2018 deaths
Scottish rugby union players
Scotland international rugby union players
British & Irish Lions rugby union players from Scotland
Edinburgh University RFC players
Alumni of the University of Edinburgh
Leicester Tigers players
Scotland Possibles players
Edinburgh District (rugby union) players
Cities District players
Royal Air Force rugby union players
20th-century Royal Air Force personnel
Rugby union scrum-halves